Go Won (also known as Chuu & Go Won) is the eleventh single album from South Korean girl group Loona's pre-debut project. It was released digitally on January 30 and physically on January 31, 2018, by Blockberry Creative and distributed by Vlending Co., Ltd. and Windmill ENT. It officially introduces member Go Won and contains two tracks, one being a duet with Chuu featuring Kim Lip.

Track listing

Charts

References

2018 singles
Loona (group) albums
Single albums
Blockberry Creative singles